Figment, a small purple dragon, occasionally seen sporting a yellow sweater, is the mascot of the "Imagination!" pavilion at the Epcot theme park at Walt Disney World Resort. He is extensively seen in Epcot merchandise.

History
Figment was created by Tony Baxter, who came up with the name "Figment" after watching an episode of Magnum, P.I., in which a goat has eaten Higgins' (John Hillerman) flowers and Higgins says, "Don't tell me [the goat is] a figment of my imagination. Figments don't eat rare tropical flowers".

The Journey Into Imagination pavilion opened with the rest of EPCOT Center on October 1, 1982, but the Journey Into Imagination dark ride did not open until March 5, 1983. In the original attraction,  Dreamfinder, a jolly wizard-like scientist, teaches Figment how to use his imagination. Figment is meant to be the literal embodiment of the phrase "figment of the imagination". He is composed of various elements Dreamfinder found in his travels including two tiny wings, large yellow eyes, the horns of a steer (or dilemma, according to a 1983 appearance on the Today Show), a crocodile's snout, and the childish delight found at a birthday party. Figment is described in detail in the Dreamfinder's song "One Little Spark" (by the Sherman Brothers). Dreamfinder introduces him: "Two tiny wings, eyes big and yellow, horns of a steer, but a lovable fellow. From head to tail, he's royal purple pigment, and there, voila, you've got a Figment".

Though taking on many disguises within the attractions, including being a superhero, a cowboy, a knight, a skunk, a dancer, a mountain climber, and a pirate, Figment seems to have some special aspirations to be an astronaut, from being seen in a spacesuit in the original and current attractions to dialogue in the original stating "I wish I could be an astronaut. I bet I can use imagination to discover all kinds of new things!" Because of this, Figment is frequently portrayed in merchandising in a spacesuit, in addition to some of his other roles.

In 1999, Disney radically refurbished the Journey Into Imagination attraction as part of its Millennium Celebration at Epcot, removing Dreamfinder and Figment except for fleeting glimpses of the dragon. That version, titled Journey Into Your Imagination, was a completely new experience in which Dr. Nigel Channing (Eric Idle of Monty Python fame) led a tour of the fictional Imagination Institute. The Channing character originated in the adjacent Honey, I Shrunk the Audience 3-D movie attraction.

In the current version, Figment's creativity has a bit of a larger effect on the world around him, be it transforming a large smell emitting machine into a slot machine, turning his house upside down, actually rearranging an otherwise static eye chart, and transforming the Institute into something almost reminiscent of the original in the finale. He can also pull a pair of glasses out of thin air to put onto Dr. Channing in the introduction and quickly change into a skunk costume in the Smell Lab.

After numerous complaints about the revamped attraction, including a Disney stockholder who questioned CEO Michael Eisner about Figment's absence during the company's annual shareholders meeting, a modest 2002 refurbishment modified the 1999 version to add the dragon as a playful foil for Dr. Channing throughout the Imagination Institute tour. The new version pointedly was branded Journey Into Imagination with Figment.

In the original attraction, Figment was voiced by Billy Barty; in the version in-between, Corey Burton portrayed Figment, and in the current version, Muppeteer Dave Goelz provides the voice, because Barty had died before the second version had shut down.

Outside the attractions at Epcot, Figment appeared in several Disney-produced educational short films in the early '80s, two of which featured Peter Pan and Alice from Alice in Wonderland (each played by a live-action actor), and has a brief cameo as a painting in the Pixar films Inside Out and Toy Story 4. Additionally, Disney and Marvel published Disney Kingdoms: Figment, a five issue miniseries focused on the origins of Figment and Dreamfinder, starting in June 2014, which was followed up with a sequel Disney Kingdom: Figment 2 in October 2015. In 2017 Figment also makes an appearance in the Guardians of the Galaxy Mission: Breakout! dark ride attraction in Disney California Adventure as a collector's item in the Collector's archive.

A film centered around the character is currently in development at Disney with Seth Rogen producing under his Point Grey Pictures banner, Dan Hernandez and Benji Samit writing the screenplay.

In February 2019, the Disney satire site Mouse Trap News, posted an article indicating that Figment would replace Mickey Mouse as the Official Disney Mascot. Mouse Trap News only places the notice that they are a fake news site on their "About" page with the disclaimer "We write fake stories about Disney Parks stuff. From Disney Park announcements to Disney Hotel and resort news to made-up Disney partnerships, you can be assured that anything you read here is not true, real, or accurate, but it is fun.", so numerous Disney fans thought this was a real news article that went viral. The fact-checking site, Snopes, published a debunking of the rumor within days

Filmography
 Would You Eat a Blue Potato? (September 1988 – 15 min)
 What Can You See By Looking? (September 1988 – 15 min)
 Do Dragons Dream? (September 1988 – 15 min)
 How Does It Feel to be an Elephant? (September 1988 – 15 min)
 How Does It Feel to Fly? (September 1988 – 14 min)
 How Does Sound Sound? (September 1988 – 14 min)
 Reading Magic with Figment and Peter Pan (August 1989 – 15 min)
 Writing Magic with Figment and Alice in Wonderland (August 1989 – 15 min)
 What's an Abra Without a Cadabra? (September 1989 – 15 min)
 Where Does Time Fly? (September 1989 – 17 min)
Case of the Missing Space (September 1989 – 16 min)
 Figment (TBA)

References

Characters of the Disney theme parks
Dragon mascots
Fictional characters introduced in 1983
Fictional characters who can duplicate themselves
Fictional characters who can teleport
Imagination! (Epcot pavilion)
Fictional shapeshifters
Branded product covers